Patsy is a given name often used as a diminutive of the feminine given name Patricia or sometimes the masculine name Patrick, or occasionally other names containing the syllable "Pat" (such as Cleopatra, Patience, or Patrice). Among Italian Americans, it is often used as a pet name for Pasquale.

In older usage, Patsy was also a nickname for Martha or Matilda, following a common nicknaming pattern of changing an M to a P (such as in Margaret → Meg/Meggy → Peg/Peggy; and Molly → Polly) and adding a feminine suffix.

President George Washington called his wife Martha "Patsy" in private correspondence. President Thomas Jefferson's eldest daughter Martha was known by the nickname "Patsy", while his daughter Mary was called "Polly".

People with the name

Female 
 Patsy Biscoe (born 1946), Australian children's entertainer
 Patricia Patsy Burt (1928–2001), British motor racing driver
 Patricia Patsy Byrne (1933–2014), English actress
 Patsy Chapman (born 1948), British newspaper editor
 Patsy Cline (1932–1963), American country singer
 Pat Danner (born 1934), American politician
 Patsy Kelly (1910–1981), American actress
 Patricia Patsy Kensit (born 1968), British actress and singer
 Patsy Knight (born 1938), American politician
 Patsy Lawlor (1933–1997), Irish politician, nurse and businesswoman
 Patricia Patsy Lovell (born 1954), English cricketer, member of the 1988 World Cup team
 Patricia Patsy May (born 1947), Australian cricketer 1968–1976
 Patsy Ruth Miller (1904–1995), American actress
 Patsy Mink (1927–2002), American politician
 Patsy Pulitzer (1928–2011), American model, socialite and philanthropist
 Patricia Patsy Ramsey (1956–2006), mother of slain child beauty queen JonBenet Ramsey
 Patsy Reddy, Governor-General of New Zealand
 Patricia Patsy Rowlands (1934–2005), British actress in the Carry On films
 Patsy Robertson (1933–2020), Jamaican diplomat and journalist
 Patsy Rodenburg (born 1953), British voice coach, author and theatre director
 Patsy O’Connell Sherman (1930–2008), American chemist and co-inventor of Scotchgard
 Patsy Smart (1918–1996), English actress
 Patricia Patsy Ticer (1935–2017), American politician
 Patsy Wolfe, Australian lawyer and judge

Male 
 Patsy Bradley (born 1984), Gaelic footballer from Northern Ireland
 Patrick Patsy Brophy (born 1970), Irish retired hurler
 Patrick A. Patsy Brown (1872–1958), Irish-American maker of uilleann pipes
 Francis Patsy Callighen (1906–1964), Canadian National Hockey League player
 Patrick Patsy Donovan (1865–1953), Irish-American Major League Baseball player and manager
 Patrick Patsy Dougherty (1876–1940), American Major League Baseball player
 Patsy Fagan (born 1951), Irish retired professional snooker player
 Patrick Patsy Foley (born 1943), Irish retired hurler
 Patsy Harte (born 1940), Irish former hurler
 Elias Henry Patsy Hendren (1889–1962), British cricketer
 Pasqualino Lolordo (1887–1929), Italian-American mobster
 Patsy McGarry, writer and newspaper editor 
 Patsy McGlone (born 1959), Irish politician
 Patsy O'Hara (1957–1981), Irish Republican hunger striker and member of the Irish National Liberation Army
 Patsy Watchorn (born 1944), Irish folk singer

Fictional characters 
 Patsy (Monty Python), in the 1975 film Monty Python and the Holy Grail, and also the 2005 Monty Python inspired musical Spamalot
 Patsy, the title character in the newspaper comic strip The Adventures of Patsy (1935–1954)
 Patsy Parisi, in HBO series The Sopranos
 Patsy Pirati, in the film Once Upon a Time in Brooklyn (2013)
 Patsy Sewer, a singer on the Canadian television program Instant Star
 Patsy Smiles, a mongoose who is in love with Lazlo in the 2005 American animated television series Camp Lazlo
 Patsy Stone, one of the main characters in the 1992–2005 British television series Absolutely Fabulous, played by Joanna Lumley
 Patsy Walker, also known as "Hellcat", a Marvel Comics superhero

Victim of deception
The popularity of the name has waned with the rise of its, chiefly North American, meaning as "dupe" or "scapegoat". Fact, Fancy and Fable, published in 1889, notes that in a sketch performed in Boston "about twenty years ago" a character would repeatedly ask "Who did that?" and the answer was "Patsy Bolivar!" It may have been popularized by the vaudevillian Billy B. Van, whose 1890s character, Patsy Bolivar, was more often than not an innocent victim of unscrupulous or nefarious characters. Van's character became a broad vaudeville "type", imitated by many comedians, including Fred Allen, who later wrote, "Patsy Bolivar was a slang name applied to a bumpkin character; later, it was shortened to Patsy, and referred to any person who was the butt of a joke."

Lee Harvey Oswald, after the assassination of John F. Kennedy, denied he was responsible for the murder, and stated: "No, they are taking me in because of the fact that I lived in the Soviet Union. I'm just a patsy!"

Byron Smith, after killing Haile Kifer and her cousin, Nicholas Brady, also claimed he was a patsy.

References

English feminine given names
Irish masculine given names
Scottish feminine given names
English masculine given names
Scottish masculine given names
Lists of people by nickname
Scottish unisex given names